The Women's 1500 metres at the 2000 Summer Olympics as part of the athletics programme was held at Stadium Australia on Wednesday 27 September, Thursday 28 September, and Saturday 30 September 2000. There were a total number of 43 participating athletes.

The top six runners in each of the initial three heats automatically qualified for the semi-final. The next six fastest runners from across the heats also qualified for the semi-final. The top five runners in each semi-final automatically qualified for the final. The next two fastest runners from across the heats also qualified for the final.

The last lap was the battleground for this final. Going into this lap, Portugal's Carla Sacramento held the lead, with Poland's Lidia Chojecka on the outside and America's Suzy Favor-Hamilton edging ahead on the inside. Over the next 200 metres, Favor-Hamilton edged ahead of Sacramento while a pack of six formed behind, led by Algeria's Nouria Mérah-Benida. Favor-Hamilton held the lead around the turn as Mérah-Benida moved to her shoulder. As the final straightaway neared, Favor-Hamilton looked at her feet expecting her usual final acceleration. It was not there, as first Mérah-Benida went by, followed by the other Polish runner, Anna Jakubczak, and then Chojecka and Romania's Violeta Szekely. After a small gap, Ethiopia's Kutre Dulecha went by Favor-Hamilton, who then crashed to the track untouched. Years later, Favor-Hamilton admitted that the fall was deliberate, as she realised that she was not going to win. As a result, she finished in last place.

At the head of the straightaway, Mérah-Benida opened up a clear lead over the two Polish runners. Moving out to lane 3, Szekely ran around Jakubczak and Chojecka, with Dulecha following in her wake. With speed, suddenly Mérah-Benida's lead started to shrink. The Algerian runner was tiring fast, but she managed to hold off Szekely's furious charge, crossing the line 0.05 seconds ahead. All the way down the straightaway, Dulecha looked like she would hold on for the bronze – but from last place with 200 metres to go, Gabriela Szabo came sprinting down the outside to take the medal, meaning that there were two Romanians on the podium. Only 0.23 seconds separated the first four runners – but none of them were directly battling the others, each taking a different pace and path to the tight finish.

Records

Medals

Results
All times shown are in seconds.
 Q denotes qualification by place in heat.
 q denotes qualification by overall place.
 DNS denotes did not start.
 DNF denotes did not finish.
 DQ denotes disqualification.
 NR denotes national record.
 OR denotes Olympic record.
 WR denotes world record.
 PB denotes personal best.
 SB denotes season best.

Qualifying heats

Round 1

Overall Results Round 1

Semi-finals

Overall Results Semi-finals

Final

References

External links
 Official Report
 Official Report of the 2000 Sydney Summer Olympics

 
1500 metres at the Olympics
2000 in women's athletics
Women's events at the 2000 Summer Olympics